Abdon ("servile") may refer to the following places or people:

Places

Abdon (biblical place), a Levitical city mentioned in the Hebrew Bible
Abdon, Shropshire, a village in Shropshire, England

Biblical figures
Abdon (Judges), the son of Hillel, a Pirathonite, the twelfth judge of Israel; also probably Bedan
The son of Micah, one of those whom Josiah sent to the prophetess Huldah; also known as Achbor
Abdon (biblical figure), several minor biblical figures

People
One of two saints and martyrs, Abdon and Sennen, killed on the same day
Abdon Ignatius Perera (1888-1955), first indigenous Postmaster General of Sri Lanka
Abdón Porte (1880–1918), Uruguayan footballer
Abdón Prats (born 1992), Spanish footballer
Abdón Reyes (born 1981), Bolivian football midfielder
Abdón Saavedra (1872–1942), Vice President of Bolivia from 1926 to 1930
Abdon Sgarbi (1903–1929), Italian footballer